Sheba, Baby is a 1975 American blaxploitation action film directed by William Girdler and starring Pam Grier and Austin Stoker.

Plot
Private investigator Sheba Shayne (Grier) returns from Chicago, Illinois to her hometown of Louisville, Kentucky, to confront thugs who are trying to intimidate her father Andy into dissolving or handing over his family insurance company business. Sheba teams up with her father’s partner, Brick Williams, and the two rekindle their old romance. Driving in her father's car, Sheba is nearly killed when the vehicle explodes. The local police warn Sheba against continuing to pursue her investigation, but she persists.

Later, four gangsters show up at Andy's office and open fire. Sheba kills three of them, but Andy is shot and killed during the battle. Sheba's investigation leads to an apartment complex, where another shootout ensues. After a chase into a nearby amusement park, Sheba extracts a confession from a gangster named Pilot that the local gang is controlled by an insurance salesman called Shark Merrill.

Sheba joins a party aboard Shark's yacht, but is identified and captured. After the gang does away with Pilot by tying him to a speedboat and dragging him through the water at high speed, they attempt to do the same to Sheba, but she escapes using a knife she had hidden in her wet suit to cut the rope. As Brick leads the police to the yacht and another gun battle breaks out, Shark tries to escape in a speedboat, but Sheba gives chase on a jet ski and kills him with a spear gun. Brick urges Sheba to continue their relationship, but Sheba insists on returning to Chicago, though she promises to return to see him again, since they are now business partners.

Cast
 Pam Grier as Sheba Shayne
 Austin Stoker as "Brick" Williams
 D'Urville Martin as Pilot
 Rudy Challenger as Andy Shayne
 Dick Merrifield as "Shark" Merrill

Reception
Roger Ebert gave the film 1.5 stars out of 4 and expressed his wish to see Pam Grier's "screen personality used in a better-directed film with more ambition." Vincent Canby of The New York Times called the film "a moderately entertaining B picture in the mode of 'Foxy Brown' and 'Coffy,' though somewhat less violent." Variety wrote, "Once you get past Grier's dazzling looks — and with coiffed hair, she looks better here than ever before — this is a flat suspenser kept unexciting by plodding pacing and poorly-shot action sequences." Gene Siskel of the Chicago Tribune gave the film 1 star out of 4 and wrote, "The sound track occasionally misses lips, the dialog always is stilted, and the fight scenes look as tho they've been choreographed at half speed." Linda Gross of the Los Angeles Times wrote, "'Sheba, Baby' is a routine adventure story but thankfully the racism and violence are minimal. William Girdler's direction is listless and lethargic and there is an embarrassing lack of electricity between Miss Grier and Stoker."

Soundtrack
Barbara Mason sang vocals on the tracks "Sheba Baby," "I'm In Love With You," "A Good Man Is Gone," and "She Did It" on the soundtrack for the film.

Releases
Arrow Films released a restored Blu-ray edition of the film in 2016, which includes a new documentary ("Pam Grier: The AIP Years") and two audio commentaries.

See also
 List of American films of 1975
 List of blaxploitation films

Sources
Bogle, Donald. Blacks in American Films and Television: An Illustrated Encyclopedia. New York: Simon and Schuster, 1989. p. 187

References

External links
 
 
 
 
 

1975 films
American International Pictures films
Blaxploitation films
1975 action films
American detective films
Films directed by William Girdler
Films shot in Chicago
Films set in Kentucky
American neo-noir films
1970s English-language films
1970s American films